Christies Beach may refer to
 Christies Beach, South Australia a southern suburb of Adelaide
 Christies Beach (Nova Scotia) a Provincial Protected Beach in Nova Scotia, Canada